Villa Ángela is a city in the province of Chaco, Argentina, 186 km west of the provincial capital Resistencia. It is on the Gran Chaco, a lowland region of the Río de la Plata basin.

History 
In 1908, Carlos Gruneisen y Julio Ulises Martin (Swiss, born 31 July 1862, creator of the Yerbatera Martin, in Rosario), acquired the land that would become the jurisdiction of Villa Angela.  He had the tannin factory, La Chaqueña S.A., built and the adjacent areas immediately began to be settled.

Punta de rieles and km 95 were the names it first received when it was no more than a hamlet. In 1910, as a tribute to the centennial of the May Revolution and 24 May, they decided to found a village and give it the name Villa Ángela. It was named after Ángela Joostens, the wife of Julio Ulises Martin, one of its two founders.

The city boasts one of the major Carnavals of the country.  This popular festival extends from mid-January to mid-February since 1950.

Weather
The city's weather is subtropical, dry in winter and very wet and hot in the summer.
Record high: 46 °C
Record low: -6 °C
Average annual precipitation: 1,100 mm

External links
Official city website in Spanish
Local development office website in Spanish

References

 
 LiveArgentina.
 Villa Ángela en la Red — Portal of the city.

Populated places in Chaco Province
1910 establishments in Argentina
Cities in Argentina
Argentina